Aluterus schoepfii, the orange filefish, is a species of fish in the family Monacanthidae. The species can also be listed under the family Balistidae.

Characteristics
Orange filefish can be distinguished by the presence of 2 dorsal spines and 32-29 dorsal soft rays. They do not have anal spines but have 35–41 anal soft rays. The pelvic terminus is absent, the body has numerous small round orange or orange-yellow spots, and the lips are often blackish.

Distribution
Orange filefish are distributed along the Western Atlantic. This includes Nova Scotia, Bermuda, and the northern Gulf of Mexico to Brazil. Distributions along the Eastern Atlantic include Cape Blanc and Mauritania to Angola.

Environment
They are subtropical, found between 46°N and 33°S latitudes.

Habitat
These fish are usually found solitary or in pairs over sea bottoms with sea grass, sand, or mud. Juveniles can be found associated with floating Sargassum.

Feeding
Orange filefish feed on a variety of aquatic vegetation, including sea grasses and algae.

Importance to humans
Orange filefish are considered trash fish and rarely consumed by humans. In Brazil these fish are traded as aquarium fish. These fish contain a poison (ciguatoxin) in their flesh, which may cause ciguatera poisoning if eaten.

Similar species
The dotterel filefish is similar to the orange filefish, although the dotterel filefish has a longer tail fin and no orange spots along the body. The orange filefish differs from other triggerfishes by having only 2 dorsal spines.

References

Monacanthidae
Fish of the Atlantic Ocean
Fish described in 1792